Fernande Bayetto (9 October 1928 – 7 November 2015) was a French alpine skier who competed in the 1948 Winter Olympics.

References

1928 births
2015 deaths
French female alpine skiers
Olympic alpine skiers of France
Alpine skiers at the 1948 Winter Olympics
Sportspeople from Haute-Savoie